Seyed Mahdi Shahrokhi (born 23 May, 1985) is an Iranian athlete specializing in the shot put. He won several medals at the regional level.

He has a personal best of 19.57 meters outdoors (2007) and 18.32 meters indoors (2009).

Competition record

References

1985 births
Living people
Iranian male shot putters
Athletes (track and field) at the 2006 Asian Games
Asian Games competitors for Iran
Competitors at the 2005 Summer Universiade
Competitors at the 2007 Summer Universiade
Islamic Solidarity Games competitors for Iran
Islamic Solidarity Games medalists in athletics